The Beth Olam Cemetery is a historic cemetery in Cypress Hills, Brooklyn, New York, United States. It is located in the city's Cemetery Belt, bisected by the border between Brooklyn and Queens.

It is a rural cemetery in style, and was started in 1851 by three Manhattan Jewish congregations: Congregation Shearith Israel (Spanish Portuguese) on West 70th Street, B'nai Jeshurun on West 89th Street, and Temple Shaaray Tefila on East 79th Street.

In 1882, Calvert Vaux was commissioned to design a small, red brick Metaher house or place of purification and pre-burial eulogies, near the entrance to the Shearith Israel section, and also designed its gates. It is the only religious building that Vaux, the co-designer of Central Park, is known to have designed. Many mausoleum windows are made with Tiffany stained glass and LaFarge bronze doors. 

The burial ground contains many examples of architecture and funerary art.

Vandalism
In April 2019, thieves stole 14 doors from mausoleums valued at $30,000 and 75 air vents.

Notable burials
 Joseph Mayor Asher (1872–1908), English-born American rabbi of B'nai Jeshurun and professor of the Jewish Theological Seminary of America
 Nathan Bijur (1862–1930), American lawyer and New York Supreme Court Justice
 Abraham Cohn (1832–1897), American Civil War Union Army soldier and recipient of the Medal of Honor
 Abraham Lopes Cardozo (1914–2006), Dutch-born hazzan of Congregation Shearith Israel
 Benjamin Cardozo (1870–1938), American lawyer and Associate Justice of the Supreme Court of the United States
 Emma Lazarus (1849–1887), American author, poet, and activist, who wrote the sonnet "The New Colossus" describing the Statue of Liberty; niece of Jacques Judah Lyons
 Uriah P. Levy (1792–1862), American naval officer, real estate investor, philanthropist, and the first Jewish Commodore of the United States Navy
 Jacques Judah Lyons (1814–1877), Surinamese-born American rabbi of Congregation Shearith Israel; uncle of Emma Lazarus
 Henry Pereira Mendes (1852–1937) British-born American rabbi of Congregation Shearith Israel
 Benjamin F. Peixotto (1834–1890), American lawyer and diplomat
 Judith Salzedo Peixotto (1823–1881), American teacher and principal
 N. Taylor Phillips (1868–1955), American lawyer and politician
 David de Sola Pool (1885–1970), British-born American rabbi of Congregation Shearith Israel
 Moses J. Stroock (1866–1931), American lawyer

References

External links
 

1851 establishments in New York (state)
Buildings and structures completed in 1851
National Register of Historic Places in Brooklyn
National Register of Historic Places in Queens, New York
Georgian architecture in New York (state)
Cemeteries in Brooklyn
Cypress Hills, Brooklyn